Knut Tore Apeland (born 11 December 1968 in Vinje) is a former Norwegian Nordic combined skier who competed during the 1990s, winning at the FIS Nordic World Ski Championships, and the Winter Olympics in the team events.

Apeland won two medals at the Winter Olympics, both silvers in the 3 x 10 km team event (1992, 1994) and four medals at the Nordic skiing world championships (one individual and three in the team event).

External links
 
 

1968 births
Living people
Norwegian male Nordic combined skiers
Olympic Nordic combined skiers of Norway
Nordic combined skiers at the 1992 Winter Olympics
Nordic combined skiers at the 1994 Winter Olympics
Olympic silver medalists for Norway
FIS Nordic Combined World Cup winners
People from Vinje
Olympic medalists in Nordic combined
FIS Nordic World Ski Championships medalists in Nordic combined
Medalists at the 1992 Winter Olympics
Medalists at the 1994 Winter Olympics
Sportspeople from Vestfold og Telemark
20th-century Norwegian people